Pedro Boese (born 1972) is a German/Portuguese painter.

Life and work
Pedro Boese was born in Beira, Portuguese Mozambique.

1993–1997: graduation from the Academie Beeldende Kunsten Maastricht in painting and etching
1998–2001: postgraduate study at the Institut für Kunst im Kontext, Berlin University of the Arts
2000–2002: guest student at the class of Prof. Lothar Baumgarten, Berlin University of the Arts
Lives and works in Berlin, Germany

The compositions of Pedro Boese exclusively arise from the overlapping of coloured and geometric circles in the picture plane.
The painting material is usually applied thinly and translucently without developing a clear texture.
Therefore, excluding the precisely set outlines, the subjective painting impression is objectified to a large extent.
Boese's recent works have been based on a grid system.

Awards
2011 Arts funding of the Cultural management of the Berlin Senate
2010 nomination for the International André-Evard Art Award, Messmer Foundation, Riegel
2006 nomination for the Gasag Art Award, Berlin
2008 nomination for the Guasch Coranty Award, Centre Cultural Metropolità, Barcelona
2007 nomination for the art award of the Bosch Rexroth AG, and IHK Würzburg

Selected solo exhibitions
2011 monomodul, Elisengallery - Raum für Kunst, Aachen
2008/2009 Motive, MARS, Berlin
2007 269 Colors + Interferences, Scotty Enterprises Gallery, Berlin
2006 keine gewissheit für die augen, Gallery Weisser Elefant, Berlin
2006 repulsion, projectspace Gebauerhöfe, Berlin
2006 Art Forum of the Pax-Bank Berlin
2004 Art Forum of the DONG energy, Kopenhagen

Selected group exhibitions
2012  Dot.Systems-from Pointillism to Pixelization, Wilhelm-Hack-Museum, Ludwigshafen
2010 Messmer Foundation, Riegel
2009 Farbe konkret, Gallery Nord / Kunstverein Tiergarten, Berlin
2008 Centre Cultural Metropolità Tecla Sala, Barcelona
2008 La intimidad y el distanciamiento, Museo para la Identidad Nacional, Tegucigalpa, Honduras
2007 The Art of Drive and Control, Bosch Rexroth AG, IHK Würzburg
2007 La intimidad y el distanciamiento, Museo de Arte de El Salvador, San Salvador
2005 Abstrakte Perspektiven, Gallery Nord/Kunstverein Tiergarten, Berlin
2004 Große Kunstausstellung, Villa Kobe, Halle

Works in public collections
Berlin State Museums, Museum of Prints and Drawings
Museum Folkwang Essen, Craphics Collection
Kunstmuseum Basel, Kupferstichkabinett
Art collection of the Bosch Rexroth AG, Lohr am Main
Collection Golden Tulip Hospitality Group, Berlin
Collection Danish Oil & Natural Gas, Kopenhagen

See also
 List of German painters

References

External links
 official catalogue: Guasch Coranty Award (PDF)
 official website

1972 births
Living people
20th-century Portuguese painters
20th-century Portuguese male artists
Portuguese male painters
21st-century Portuguese painters
21st-century Portuguese male artists
20th-century German painters
20th-century German male artists
German male painters
21st-century German painters
21st-century German male artists
Abstract painters
People from Beira, Mozambique